The 2020–21 Copa de la Reina was the 36th edition of the Copa de la Reina, Spain's annual field hockey cup competition for women. It was held from 11 to 13 December 2020 in Valencia, at the Estadio Beteró and CH Tarongers.

Júnior won the tournament for the second time, defeating Club de Campo 2–1 in the final. CD Terrassa finished in third place after defeating Club Egara 2–0 in penalties following a 0–0 draw.

Qualified teams
The tournament was contested by the top eight ranked teams from the first half of the 2020–21 season of the Liga Iberdrola.

CD Terrassa
Club de Campo
Club Egara
Júnior
Real Club de Polo
Sanse Complutense
Sardinero
UD Taburiente

Officials
The following umpires were appointed by the RFEH to officiate the tournament:

Sandra Adell (ESP)
Noelia Blanco (ESP)
Gema Calderón (ESP)
Pilar López (ESP)
María Mercedes Romero (ESP)
Ana Ortega (ESP)
Nayra Rodríguez (ESP)
Laura Trujillo (ESP)

Results

Knockouts

Quarterfinals

First to fourth place classification

Semi-finals

Third and fourth place

Final

Awards

References

External links
Real Federación Española de Hockey

field hockey
field hockey
Spain